Sì miào wán or the four marvels is a remedy used in Traditional Chinese medicine.  It is available in powder and pill form.  It contains, among other things, quercetin, berberine, and achyranthine.

Contents
It contains the same ingredients as Sān miào wán ("Three marvel pills"), which are the bark of huáng bǎi ("yellow fir"), the root of cāng zhú ("[black] atractylodes"), and huái niú xī (the root of Achyranthes bidentata), plus the fourth, yi yi ren (Job's tears).

The active chemicals found in these substances include:

 Quercetin, which has an LD50 (the amount that kills 50 percent of mice fed the chemical) equal to the cytotoxic chemotherapy drug methotrexate, which is approximately 150 milligrams per kilogram of body weight; and
 Berberine, a yellow dye that is known to cause brain damage in infants and severe hemolysis (destruction of red blood cells) in some.

As with all herbal treatments that have not been standardized (diluted or concentrated on the basis of laboratory tests done on each batch produced), the amount of the active chemicals received in one dose is unknown.

References

Traditional Chinese medicine pills